Northwest Federal Field at Pfitzner Stadium, nicknamed "The Pfitz", is a stadium in the Coles Magisterial District of Prince William County, Virginia. It is primarily used for baseball, and was the home field of the Potomac Nationals before they relocated to Fredericksburg in 2020.  Built in 1984, the stadium is near the McCoart Government Center, the offices of the Prince William County Service Authority, and the Sean Connaughton Community Plaza.  It seats 6,000 people.

Layout

The fences at Pfitzner Stadium are 315 feet down the lines and 400 feet to straight-away center field. There is an electronic scoreboard in left-center field capable of displaying images as well as some video. The dugouts at the stadium are unusual in that they are located at field level, and prior to 2018 there was no fence or rail separating them from the field. However, as part of renovations completed following the 2017 season, netting was added in front of both the home and visiting dugouts.

History

2011-2012 improvements
After the 2011 season, the field was redone to upgrade it to MLB specifications, as the previous field failed to meet those standards. This was done due to moving a series because of unsafe conditions.

2012 fire
A one-alarm fire caused by an inside gas leak destroyed the facility's business offices on June 29, 2012. There were no fatalities or injuries. Other parts of the stadium, including the concession stands one level below the offices, were not damaged. The fire put the Nationals' mascot Uncle Slam out of action for the remainder of the Carolina League season.

Naming history
The stadium was originally known as Davis Ford Park before being renamed Prince William County Stadium in 1986 and then G. Richard Pfitzner Stadium in 1996. 

On May 3, 2018, the Potomac Nationals announced that as part of a sponsorship deal with Northwest Federal Credit Union, the stadium would be renamed Northwest Federal Field at Pfitzner Stadium. The naming rights deal also included the stadium's field tarp and bullpen picnic area.

Potomac Nationals occupation

Departure of the Potomac Nationals 
The Potomac Nationals, playing at Pfitzner Stadium since 1984, began seeking a better ballpark at least as early as 1998, with various proposals made in 2000, 2002, 2005, 2010, 2011, and 2016. 

In December 2016 reports emerged of a possible new Potomac Nationals stadium. Two County Supervisors said that team owner Art Silber told them Minor League Baseball is requiring the team to be out of Pfitzner Stadium by the end of the 2018 season.

In June 2018, Potomac Nationals owner Art Silber announced that he had signed a letter of intent to build a new stadium in Fredericksburg, Virginia that would open in April 2020, though the deal actually calls for the facility to be ready for public events by April 1, 2021. The Potomac Nationals played their last regular season game at Pfitzner Stadium on August 29, 2019.

References

External links
Ballpark History | Potomac Nationals Pfitzner Stadium
G. Richard Pfitzner Stadium Views – Ball Parks of the Minor Leagues

Minor league baseball venues
Sports in Northern Virginia
Baseball venues in Virginia
Sports venues completed in 1984
Buildings and structures in Prince William County, Virginia
1984 establishments in Virginia
Sports venues in the Washington metropolitan area